Crambus patulellus is a moth in the family Crambidae. It was described by Francis Walker in 1863. It is found in Rio de Janeiro, Brazil.

References

Crambini
Moths described in 1863
Moths of South America